Rembate parish is an administrative unit of Ogre Municipality in the Vidzeme region of Latvia. From 2009 until 2021, it was part of the former Ķegums Municipality.

References 

Parishes of Latvia
Ogre Municipality
Vidzeme